Peter Dinda from the Northwestern University, Evanston, Illinois was named Fellow of the Institute of Electrical and Electronics Engineers (IEEE) in 2015 for contributions to virtualization technologies in adaptive and parallel computing.

References

Fellow Members of the IEEE
Living people
Year of birth missing (living people)
Place of birth missing (living people)
Northwestern University faculty
American electrical engineers